Peter Fenwick (born July 18, 1944) is a Canadian politician. He is a former leader of the Newfoundland and Labrador New Democratic Party.

Fenwick was born in St. Thomas, Ontario to Digby and Benoit Fenwick of Montreal and Stanbridge East. He and his wife Jennifer moved to Cape St George, Newfoundland in 1968 and had six children. His oldest son attended school at Notre Dame du Cap in the first early immersion French program in 1975 of which five of the six graduated.

He was a community college teacher when he was acclaimed provincial NDP leader at the party's convention on November 8, 1981.

Fenwick was first elected to the Newfoundland and Labrador House of Assembly in a 1984 by-election in Menihek, Labrador. He was the first member of the party to be elected to a seat in the House of Assembly. He was re-elected in 1985. He stepped down as leader in 1989 and did not stand for re-election to the House of Assembly in that year's election. While leader of the party in 1986, he was arrested along with union representatives who participated in a strike by the Newfoundland Association of Public Employees (NAPE).

In the 2000 federal election, Fenwick ran in the federal riding of Burin—St. George's for the Canadian Alliance Party, the predecessor of the Conservative Party, and came in fourth out five candidates.

Fenwick has since become a high-profile journalist, columnist, and commentator.

Fenwick opened, Inn at the Cape, a B&B in Cape St. George in 2002, and in 2006, became the president of the Newfoundland and Labrador B&B Association, a position he held until October 2009.

Fenwick became the mayor of the Town of Cape St. George in September 2005 and was acclaimed to the position in September 2009.  During his term as Mayor he served as the chair of the Southwest Coast Joint Municipal Council.

References

1944 births
Leaders of the Newfoundland and Labrador NDP/CCF
Living people
Newfoundland and Labrador New Democratic Party MHAs
Newfoundland and Labrador candidates for Member of Parliament
People from St. Thomas, Ontario
Mayors of places in Newfoundland and Labrador